Georgi Stanchev Kanev (6 May 1934 – 19 December 2012) was a Bulgarian basketball player. He competed in the men's tournament at the 1956 Summer Olympics, and the 1960 Summer Olympics.

References

External links

1934 births
2012 deaths
Bulgarian men's basketball players
1959 FIBA World Championship players
Olympic basketball players of Bulgaria
Basketball players at the 1956 Summer Olympics
Basketball players at the 1960 Summer Olympics
People from Kazanlak